Jiguan District is a district and the seat of the city of Jixi, Heilongjiang province, People's Republic of China.

Administrative divisions 
Jiguan District is divided into 7 subdistricts and 2 townships. 
7 subdistricts
 Xiangyang, Nanshan, Lixin, Dongfeng, Hongjunlu, Xijixi, Xishan
2 townships
 Hongxing, Xijiao

Notes and references 

Jiguan